The 1999 Towson Tigers football team was an American football team that represented Towson University during the 1999 NCAA Division I-AA football season. Towson finished third in the Patriot League.

In their eighth year under head coach Gordy Combs, the Tigers compiled a 7–4 record. 

The Tigers outscored opponents 302 to 255. Their 4–2 conference record placed third in the seven-team Patriot League standings. 

Towson played its home games at Minnegan Stadium on the university campus in Towson, Maryland.

Schedule

References

Towson
Towson Tigers football seasons
Towson Tigers football